Below are the ice hockey national team rosters of the 1976 Canada Cup.

Canada
Forwards and defence: Bill Barber, Bobby Clarke, Marcel Dionne, Phil Esposito, Bob Gainey, Danny Gare, Bobby Hull, Guy Lafleur, Guy Lapointe, Reggie Leach, Richard Martin, Peter Mahovlich, Lanny McDonald, Bobby Orr, Gilbert Perreault, Denis Potvin, Larry Robinson, Serge Savard, Steve Shutt, Darryl Sittler, Carol Vadnais, Jimmy Watson; Training camp only -- Dave Burrows, Dan Maloney, Jean Pronovost, Rene Robert and Paul Shmyr 
Goaltenders: Gerry Cheevers, Glenn Resch, Rogatien Vachon; Dan Bouchard (training camp only)
Coaches: Scotty Bowman, Don Cherry, Bobby Kromm, Al MacNeil

Czechoslovakia
Forwards and defence: Josef Augusta, Jiří Bubla, František Černík, Milan Chalupa, Miroslav Dvořák, Bohuslav Ebermann, Ivan Hlinka, Jiří Holík, Karel Holý, František Kaberle, Milan Kajkl, Oldřich Machač, Vladimír Martinec, Jiří Novák, Milan Nový, František Pospíšil, Jaroslav Pouzar, Pavel Richter, Vladimír Šándrík, Bohuslav Šťastný, Marián Šťastný, Peter Šťastný
Goaltenders: Vladimír Dzurilla, Jiří Holeček
Coaches: Karel Gut, Ján Starší

Finland
Forwards and defence: Tapio Flinck, Matti Hagman, Hannu Kapanen, Veli-Pekka Ketola, Pertti Koivulahti, Tapio Koskinen, Tapio Levo, Harri Linnonmaa, Lasse Litma, Kari Makkonen, Timo Nummelin, Lasse Oksanen, Esa Peltonen, Jouni Peltonen, Pekka Rautakallio, Matti Rautiainen, Seppo Repo, Heikki Riihiranta, Jouni Rinne, Timo Saari, Juhani Tamminen, Jorma Vehmanen
Goaltenders: Antti Leppänen, Markus Mattsson, Jorma Valtonen
Coaches: Lasse Heikkilä, Carl Brewer

Sweden
Forwards and defence: Mats Åhlberg, Thommie Bergman, Per-Olov Brasar, Lars-Erik Ericsson, Roland Eriksson, Lars-Erik Esbjörs, Inge Hammarström, Anders Hedberg, Björn Johansson, Dan Labraaten, Willy Lindström, Tord Lundström, Lars-Göran Nilsson, Ulf Nilsson, Stig Östling, Börje Salming, Stig Salming, Lars-Erik Sjöberg, Jan-Olov Svensson, Mats Waltin, Juha Widing, Kjell-Arne Wikström
Goaltenders: Hardy Åström, Göran Högosta, William Löfqvist
Coaches: Hans "Virus" Lindberg

United States
Forwards and defence: Fred Ahern, Curt Bennett, Harvey Bennett, Dan Bolduc, Rick Chartraw, Mike Christie, Lee Fogolin, Robbie Ftorek, Alan Hangsleben, Steve Jensen, Mike Milbury, Lou Nanne, Joe Noris, Bill Nyrop, Gerry O'Flaherty, Doug Palazzari, Craig Patrick, Larry Pleau, Mike Polich, Gary Sargent, Dean Talafous, Warren "Butch" Williams; Training camp only -- Stan Gilbertson, Jim Niekamp, Gordie Roberts, Peter Scamurra, Bobby Sheehan and Timothy Sheehy 
Goaltenders: Mike Curran, Pete LoPresti, Cap Raeder; Ed Walsh (training camp only)
Coaches: Bob Pulford, Harry Neale

USSR
Forwards and defence: Boris Alexandrov, Sergei Babinov, Helmut Balderis, Valeri Belousov, Zinetula Bilyaletdinov, Aleksandr Golikov, Alexander Gusev, Sergei Kapustin, Vladimir Kovin, Vladimir Krikunov, Aleksandr Kulikov, Viktor Kuznetsov, Yuri Lebedev, Vladimir Lutchenko, Alexander Maltsev, Vladimir Repnev, Viktor Shalimov, Aleksandr Skvortsov, Valeri Vasiliev, Vladimir Vikulov, Viktor Zhluktov
Goaltenders: Vladislav Tretiak, Mihails Vasiļonoks, Viktor Zinger
Coaches: Viktor Tikhonov, Boris Mayorov, Robert Cherenkov

Sources
"Coupe Canada 1976 Canada Cup" Official Match Program, Controlled Media Corp.,1976

Canada Cup rosters
1976 in ice hockey